Space's Deepest Secrets is a documentary science television series narrated by David O'Brien. Aired by the Science Channel, it premiered on April 26, 2016.

According to the Science Channel, "Space's Deepest Secrets shares the stories of the men and women who pushed their ingenuity and curiosity beyond the limits to uncover some of the most groundbreaking findings in the history of space exploration."

Space's Deepest Secrets includes both original episodes and specials. Specials began in Season 3, and each special consists of material previously broadcast in two or more earlier episodes of Space's Deepest Secrets or other Science Channel shows, edited together so as to address a new subject related to that of the previously broadcast episodes. In addition to segments from previous Space's Deepest Secrets original episodes, Space's Deepest Secrets specials have included segments originally broadcast in episodes of shows such as How the Universe Works, Strip the Cosmos, and Mars: The Secret Science.

Episode list

Season 1 (2016)

Season 2 (2017)

Season 3 (2017)

Season 4 (2018)

Season 5 (2018)

Season 6 (2019)

Season 7 (2020)

Season 8 (2021)

See also
Alien Planet
Cosmos: A Spacetime Odyssey
Extreme Universe
How the Universe Works
Into the Universe with Stephen Hawking
Killers of the Cosmos
Mars: The Secret Science
The Planets and Beyond
Strip the Cosmos
Through the Wormhole
The Universe

References

External links
sciencechannel.com Space′s Deepest Secrets

trakt.tv Space's Deepest Secrets
tvmaze.com Space's Deepest Secrets – Episode Guide

2016 American television series debuts
2010s American documentary television series
Documentary television series about astronomy
Science Channel original programming